Oksana Nikolayevna Slivenko (born 20 December 1986 in Chekhov, Moscow Oblast), known professionally as Oxana Slivenko, is a Russian weightlifter.

Career 
She won the silver medal at the 2005 Junior World Championships in the 63 kg category, and again at the 2006 Junior World Championships in the 69 kg category.

Slivenko participated in the women's 69 kg class at the 2006 World Weightlifting Championships and won the gold medal, with a World Record snatch of 123 kg, and clean and jerking an additional 140 kg for a total of 263 kg.

At the 2007 World Weightlifting Championships she won the gold medal again in the 69 kg class, with a World Record total of 276 kg.

She won the silver medal in the 69 kg category at the 2008 Summer Olympics, with a total of 255 kg but was upgraded to gold as the original gold medalist from China was disqualified for doping.

Slivenko was forced to withdraw from London Olympics in 2012 after suffering an injury in a training session.

In 2018, Slivenko received a two-year ban for using performance-enhancing drugs.

Career statistics

References

External links 
  at beijing2008

1986 births
Living people
People from Chekhovsky District
Russian female weightlifters
Weightlifters at the 2008 Summer Olympics
Olympic weightlifters of Russia
Olympic gold medalists for Russia
Russian sportspeople in doping cases
World Weightlifting Championships medalists
World record setters in weightlifting
Olympic medalists in weightlifting
Medalists at the 2008 Summer Olympics
Universiade medalists in weightlifting
Universiade gold medalists for Russia
European Weightlifting Championships medalists
Sportspeople from Moscow Oblast
21st-century Russian women